Originally, various track gauges were used in the United States. As a general rule, southern railroads were built to one or another broad gauge, mostly , while northern railroads that were not standard-gauge tended to be narrow-gauge. The Pacific Railroad Acts of 1863 specified standard gauge.

Notable exceptions were the  railroads that predominated in the first part of the 19th century in New York State, and the  lines centered on Portland, Maine. Problems began as soon as lines began to meet, and standard gauge was adopted in much of the northeastern U.S. Standard gauge had spread widely across the country by the late 19th century except in some parts of the South; it was adopted there in a two-day changeover on May 31-June 1, 1886.

Today, standard gauge is used almost everywhere in the U.S. Non-standard gauges remain in use only for some municipal and regional mass transit systems not requiring interchange of equipment.

Broad gauges

gauge 
The New York and Erie Railroad was originally  gauge, and spawned a regional network of other six foot gauge railroads within New York State. Other railroads connecting to the Erie were soon built, able to interchange freight and passenger cars, forming a true regional six foot gauged railroad network across the southern tier of New York State from the Hudson River to the shores of Lake Erie.

Major cities including Rochester, Syracuse, Utica, and Albany all were connected by six foot gauged railroads extending from Elmira and Binghamton on the New York and Erie mainline. These lines included the Avon, Genesee & Mt. Morris, the Albany and Susquehanna (later part of the Delaware and Hudson), the Elmira, Jefferson & Canandaigua (later the Northern Central, becoming part of the Pennsylvania Railroad), the Rochester & Genesee Valley, the Canandaigua and Niagara Falls (initially Erie controlled, later part of the New York Central railroad's Peanut Route along the shoreline of Lake Ontario), and even the mainline of rival, and future (1960) merger partner, the Delaware, Lackawanna, and Western (The Lackawanna also had a significant portion of its six-foot gauge trackage in Pennsylvania and New Jersey). Other 6 ft gauge lines included the Syracuse, Binghamton & New York (later part of the Lackawanna), the Walkill Valley railroad (later part of the New York Central), and the Erie's own Newburgh branch. Between 1876 and 1880, most of the 6 ft lines converted to standard gauge, some having been first dual gauged with a third running rail allowing standard gauge trains to share the track, prior to the removal of the 6 ft rails.

gauge
The Portland Company was formed to build locomotives of this gauge for use on the local rail system. The gauge was known as "Texas gauge" while required by Texas law until 1875, and used by the New Orleans, Opelousas and Great Western Railroad (NOO&GW) until 1872, and by the Texas and New Orleans Railroad until 1876. The New England railways were similarly standard-gauged in the 1870s.

In the 1960s, the gauge was selected for use in the Bay Area Rapid Transit system, serving the San Francisco Bay Area; it is the only place in the United States where this gauge is in use.

gauge 
 Baltimore Streetcar Museum Formerly used in the MTA Maryland.
 United Railways and Electric Company

Pennsylvania trolley gauges 
Unlike other broad gauges, it remains in use in a number of urban rail transit systems.

New Orleans streetcars
 SEPTA (Southeastern Pennsylvania Transportation Authority)
 Routes 101 and 102 suburban light rail lines
 Pittsburgh Light Rail
 Streetcars in Cincinnati (1859–1951; standard gauge 2016-present)
 West Penn Railways (1904–1952 defunct)

SEPTA (Southeastern Pennsylvania Transportation Authority)
 Market–Frankford Line
 Subway–surface trolley lines and Route 15 surface trolley line

gauge

In most of the southern states, the  gauge was preferred (a broad gauge which later was adopted by Russia for its new railroad and became known as Russian gauge). This configuration allowed for wider rolling stock that could more efficiently accommodate cotton bales, the most commonly transported good in the South at the time. This gauge remains in use by Pittsburgh's two funicular railways, the Monongahela Incline (the oldest continuously operating funicular in the United States, having opened in 1870) and the Duquesne Incline.

Most of the original track in Ohio was built in  gauge, the Ohio gauge.

Narrow gauges

gauge
The Washington Metro system in the D.C. metropolitan area was built to  narrow gauge.

gauge

The world's first operational mountain-climbing cog railway (rack-and-pinion railway), the Mount Washington Cog Railway in Coos County, New Hampshire — in operation since its opening in 1869 — uses a 4 ft 8 inch (1,422 mm) rail gauge, as designed by Sylvester Marsh, the creator of the Marsh rack system for ensuring firm traction going up and down the slopes of the highest mountain in New England.

gauge

gauge

gauge

 gauge railways became the dominant narrow gauge throughout the United States from the Boston, Revere Beach and Lynn Railroad of Massachusetts to the Pacific Coast Railway of California. The gauge was also used by the Oahu Railway and Land Company of Hawaii, the White Pass and Yukon Route of Alaska and the East Broad Top Railroad of Pennsylvania, which operates as of 2022. Heritage railroads operate portions of the formerly extensive Colorado system as the Durango and Silverton Narrow Gauge Railroad and Cumbres and Toltec Scenic Railroad.

gauge

The Angels Flight and Court Flight funicular railways of Los Angeles used . The gauge was also used for the Yosemite Short Line Railway, the Pacific Coast Steamship Company's horse-powered tramway near Pismo Beach, California, Michigan's Harbor Springs Railway, and several Hawaiian sugar plantation railways. This became a popular gauge for heritage railways in California, Florida, Hawaii, Minnesota, Montana, Nebraska, Oregon, and Pennsylvania.

gauge

Several Maine railroads used  gauge following demonstration on the Billerica and Bedford Railroad in 1877, including the Sandy River and Rangeley Lakes Railroad, the Wiscasset, Waterville and Farmington Railway, the Kennebec Central, the Monson Railroad, and the Saco Biddeford & Harrison (later the Biddeford & Harrison). When these railroads ceased operation in the 1930s and 1940s, much of their equipment was transferred to the Edaville Railroad, which, as of 2019, remains in operation as one of the oldest American heritage railroads. Also as of 2019, the Maine Narrow Gauge Railroad Museum; Sandy River and Rangeley Lakes Railroad; Wiscasset, Waterville and Farmington Railway; and Boothbay Railway Village also continue to operate old Maine  gauge equipment.

The gauge was also used by the Mount Gretna Narrow Gauge Railway in Pennsylvania, and by some mining railways of the Rocky Mountains. Similar  gauge equipment, which was originally manufactured for the trench railways of World War I, was used on United States military bases in Alabama, Georgia, Indiana, New Jersey, and Oklahoma through World War II; and sold as military surplus for earth-moving construction through the 1920s.

Towards standardization
In the early days of rail transport in the United States, railroads tended to be built out of coastal cities into the rural interior and hinterland and systems did not connect. Each builder was free to choose its own gauge, although the availability of British-built locomotives encouraged some railroads to be built to standard gauge.

When American railroads' track extended to the point that they began to interconnect, it became clear that a single nationwide gauge would be beneficial.

Where different gauges meet, there is a "break of gauge". To overcome this issue, special compromise cars were able to run  and standard gauge track. Another application was the Ramsey car-transfer apparatus.

Gauge war
In Erie, Pennsylvania, the  Erie Railroad terminated while adjacent railroads used  gauge, also known as "Ohio gauge." This led to the Erie Gauge War in 1853–54 when the Erie mayor and citizens temporarily prevented a gauge standardization, as there would then be less trans-shipping work and through passengers would no longer have a stopover at Erie.

Pacific Railway Act of 1863

Break of gauge would prove to be a nightmare during the American Civil War (1861–65), often hindering the Confederacy's ability to move goods efficiently over long distances. The Pacific Railway Act of March 3, 1863, specified that the federally funded transcontinental railroad was to use standard gauge and helped to further popularize it among American railroads, although the standard gauge was already in use on many other lines prior to 1863.

Pressure for standardization
Following the Civil War, trade between the South and North grew sufficiently large that the break of gauge became a major economic nuisance, impeding through shipments. Competitive pressures induced most North American railways to convert to standard gauge by 1880, but Southern railroads retained their distinct,  gauge. In 1884 and 1885, two important railroads connecting Chicago to the South (the Illinois Central and the Mobile and Ohio Railroad) converted to standard gauge, increasing pressure on competing and connecting lines to do the same.

Unification to standard gauge on May 31 – June 1, 1886
In 1886, the southern railroads agreed to coordinate changing gauge on all their tracks. After considerable debate and planning, most of the southern rail network was converted from  gauge to  gauge, then the standard of the Pennsylvania Railroad, over two days beginning on Monday, May 31, 1886. The new gauge was close enough that standard gauge equipment could run on it without problem. By June 1886, all major railroads in North America, an estimated , were using approximately the same gauge. To facilitate the change, the inside spikes had been hammered into place at the new gauge in advance of the change. Rolling stock too was altered to fit the new gauge at shops and rendezvous points throughout the South. The final conversion to true standard gauge took place gradually as track was maintained. Now, the only broad-gauge rail systems in the United States are some city transit systems.

Effects of the Southern gauge change
Using historical freight traffic records, recent research has shown that the conversion to standard gauge instigated a large shift of North–South freight traffic away from coastal steamships to all-rail carriage. These effects were especially strong on short routes, where breaks in gauge were more expensive relative to the total cost and duration of carriage. However, the data indicate that the gauge change had no effect on total shipments, likely as a result of anticompetitive conduct by Southern freight carriers which prevented the railroads' cost-savings from being passed through to their prices. This research suggests that had Southern carriers not been colluding, the gauge change would have generated a sharp reduction in freight rates and immediate growth in trade between the North and South.

See also

List of track gauges

References

United States
Rail infrastructure in the United States